Rockin' Robin usually refers to either:
 Robin Yount, a former professional baseball player
 Rockin' Robin (wrestler), Robin Smith, a professional female wrestler
 "Rockin' Robin" (song), a rock 'n' roll song